Cumalar can refer to:

 Cumalar, Barda
 Cumalar, Çivril
 Cumalar, Karpuzlu